Charley Palmer Rothwell (born 9 February 1992) is an English actor. He is the son of EastEnders actress Patsy Palmer.

Early life
Rothwell was born on 9 February 1992 in Bethnal Green, London. He is the son of actress Patsy Palmer and boxer Alfie Rothwell. He has three half-siblings, from his mother's side.

Filmography

Film

Television

External links

Daily Mirror On-line article

1992 births
Living people
People from Bethnal Green
English male television actors
English male film actors
21st-century English male actors